The history of the United States from 1991 to 2008 began after the dissolution of the Soviet Union. The dissolution signaled the end of the Cold War and left the U.S. unchallenged as the world's sole superpower. The U.S. took a leading role in military involvement in the Middle East. The U.S. expelled an Iraqi invasion force from Kuwait, a Middle Eastern ally of the U.S., in the Persian Gulf War. On the domestic front, the Democrats won a return to the White House with the election of Bill Clinton in 1992. In the 1994 midterm election, the Republicans won control of Congress for the first time in 40 years. Strife between Clinton and the Republicans in Congress initially resulted in a federal government shutdown following a budget crisis, but later they worked together to pass welfare reform, the Children's Health Insurance Program, and a balanced budget. Charges from the Lewinsky scandal led to the 1998 impeachment of Clinton by the House of Representatives but he was later acquitted by the Senate. The U.S. economy boomed in the enthusiasm for high-technology industries in the 1990s until the NASDAQ crashed as the dot-com bubble burst and the early 2000s recession marked the end of the sustained economic growth.

In 2000, Republican George W. Bush was elected president in one of the closest elections in U.S. history. Early in his term, his administration approved education reform and a large across-the-board tax cut aimed at stimulating the economy. Following the September 11 attacks in 2001, the U.S. embarked on the Global War on Terrorism, starting with the 2001 war in Afghanistan to depose the Taliban and eliminate Al-Qaeda. In 2003, the U.S. invaded Iraq, deposing Saddam Hussein and setting up the Republic of Iraq resulting in a prolonged conflict that would continue over the course of the decade. The Homeland Security Department was formed and the controversial Patriot Act was passed to bolster domestic efforts against terrorism. In 2006, criticism over the handling of the disastrous Hurricane Katrina (which struck the Gulf Coast region in 2005), political scandals, and the growing unpopularity of the Iraq War helped the Democrats gain control of Congress. Saddam Hussein was later tried, charged for war crimes and crimes against humanity, and executed by hanging. In 2007, President Bush ordered a troop surge in Iraq, which ultimately led to reduced casualties.

Globalization and the new economy
During Bill Clinton's presidency American political discourse focused mostly on domestic issues. While the early 1990s saw the US economy mired in recession, a recovery began starting in 1994 and began accelerating thanks to a boom created by technology. The Internet and related technologies made their first broad penetrations into the economy, prompting a Wall Street technology-driven bubble, which Federal Reserve chairman Alan Greenspan described in 1996 as "irrational exuberance". By 1998, the economy was booming and unemployment below 5%.

After the dissolution of the Soviet Union in 1991, the United States was the world's dominant military power and Japan, sometimes seen as the largest economic rival to the U.S., was caught in a period of stagnation. China was emerging as the U.S.'s foremost trading competitor in more and more areas. Localized conflicts such as those in Haiti and the Balkans prompted President Bill Clinton to send in U.S. troops as peacekeepers, reviving the Cold-War-era controversy about whether policing the rest of the world was a proper U.S. role. Islamic radicals overseas loudly threatened assaults against the U.S. for its ongoing military presence in the Middle East, and even staged the first World Trade Center attack, a truck bombing in New York's twin towers, in 1993, as well as a number of deadly attacks on U.S. interests abroad.

Immigration, mainly from Latin America and Asia, swelled during the 1990s, laying the groundwork for great changes in the demographic makeup of the U.S. population in coming decades, such as Hispanics replacing African-Americans as the largest minority. Despite tougher border scrutiny after the September 11 attacks, nearly 8 million immigrants came to the United States from 2000 to 2005—more than in any other five-year period in the nation's history—with almost half entering illegally.

Dot-com bubble

Early 2000 to 2001 saw the dramatic bursting of the dot-com bubble. Excitement over the prospects of Internet stocks had led to huge increases in the major indexes. However, dozens of start-up Internet companies failed as many of the lofty promises heralded by the new world of the Web failed to materialize. On March 10, 2000, the NASDAQ peaked at 5,048.62, more than double its value just a year before. The downturn began on March 13, 2000, triggering a chain reaction of selling that fed on itself as investors, funds, and institutions liquidated positions. In just six days, the NASDAQ had lost nearly nine percent, falling to 4,580 on March 15. By 2001, the bubble was deflating at full speed. A majority of the dot-coms ceased trading after burning through their venture capital, many having never made a profit.

In 2002, the GDP growth rate rose to 2.8%. A major short-term problem in the first half of 2002 was a sharp decline in the stock market, fueled in part by the exposure of dubious accounting practices in some major corporations. Another was unemployment, which experienced the longest period of monthly increase since the Great Depression. The United States began to recover from the post-9/11 recession in 2003, but the robustness of the market (7% GDP growth), combined with the unemployment rate (above 6%), led some economists and politicians to refer to the situation as a "jobless recovery". Despite this, economic growth continued apace through early 2008 and unemployment dropped below 5%.

Conflicts

Persian Gulf War

The considerable dependence of the industrialized world on oil starting in the 1930s, with much of the proved oil reserves situated in Middle Eastern countries, became evident to the U.S., first in the aftermath of the 1973 world oil shock and later in the second energy crisis of 1979. Although in real terms oil prices fell back to pre-1973 levels through the 1980s, resulting in a windfall for the oil-consuming nations (especially North America, Western Europe, and Japan), the vast reserves of the leading Middle East producers guaranteed the region its strategic importance. By the early 1990s the politics of oil still proved as hazardous as it did in the early 1970s.

Conflict in the Middle East triggered yet another international crisis on August 2, 1990, when Iraq invaded and attempted to annex neighboring Kuwait. U.S. officials feared that Hussein was then on the verge of armed conflict with oil-rich Saudi Arabia, a close ally of Washington's since the 1940s. The United Nations condemned the invasion as an act of aggression; President Bush compared Hussein to Adolf Hitler and declared that if the United States and international community did not act, aggression would be encouraged elsewhere in the world. The Security Council gave Iraq a deadline to leave Kuwait, but Saddam Hussein ignored it, and the Security Council authorized a military response. The war began in January 1991, with U.S. troops forming the majority of the coalition which participated in Operation Desert Storm. By the time Iraqi troops withdrew from Kuwait in late February, Iraq had lost approximately 20,000 troops, with some sources citing as many as 100,000 casualties on the Iraqi side.

Conflicts in Somalia, Bosnia, Kosovo, and the Middle East

In December 1992, President Bush sent troops to join the UN Operation Restore Hope, a multi-national effort to restore order and provide humanitarian aid in Somalia, which was torn by civil war, famine, and warlords. By the summer of 1993, the situation had deteriorated. After 24 Pakistani soldiers were killed in June 1993, the UN passed a resolution calling for the arrest and trial of those responsible for the attack. Under the leadership of newly elected President Bill Clinton, U.S. forces launched a concentrated attack on Aidid's stronghold in Mogadishu in Operation Gothic Serpent. In October 1993, 18 soldiers were killed and 84 were wounded in the Battle of Mogadishu. After the attack, Clinton ordered U.S. forces withdrawn from the region, with the last being withdrawn by 1995, and fired his Secretary of Defense Les Aspin who had not sent adequate forces.

In the mid-1990s, the United States was involved in the Bosnian War through the North Atlantic Treaty Organization (NATO), most notably the 1995 bombing campaign, which finally led to the Dayton Peace Agreement which ended the war by the end of 1995. In early 1998, the region became volatile again as war erupted between the army of the Federal Republic of Yugoslavia and the Kosovo Liberation Army, a guerrilla group. A 1999 NATO bombing campaign struck Yugoslavia, resulting in the deaths of hundreds of Yugoslavian soldiers and civilians. As a result, Yugoslavia withdrew from Kosovo and Kosovo became an independent state.

President Clinton also ordered cruise missile strikes on Iraq in 1996 and bombing attacks on Iraq in 1998, which were launched in response to Saddam Hussein's violation of several UN resolutions, including repression of ethnic minorities (Kurds) and removing UN weapons inspectors. The 1998 campaign, in particular, was meant to de-stabilize the Iraqi government and degrade the power of Hussein. Clinton also signed the Iraq Liberation Act to appropriate funds to Iraqi opposition groups in the hopes of overthrowing Hussein's regime and establishing democracy.

Throughout the 1990s, the United States also played an active role in peace efforts in the Israeli–Palestinian conflict. President Clinton, Israeli Prime Minister Yitzhak Rabin, and Palestinian Prime Minister Yasser Arafat met and signed the Oslo Accords in 1993, which called for the gradual ceding of control of Palestinian areas to the Palestinians in exchange for peace. However, Rabin was assassinated in 1995 and by 2000, the Camp David Summit failed to yield a new agreement.

Early Islamist terrorist attacks
The 1990s also featured a series of increasingly violent attacks associated with Islamist terrorists, including al-Qaeda, a radical Islamist militant organization led by Osama bin Laden. On February 26, 1993, a truck bomb was detonated at the World Trade Center in New York City, killing six civilians and injuring 919 others, 88 firefighters, and 35 police officers. The attack was intended to destroy the foundation of the North Tower, knocking the tower into the South Tower, which would destroy both buildings and kill thousands of people. While this did not happen, the bomb caused considerable damage to the lower levels of the North Tower. In 1994, four men were convicted of carrying out the bombing and in 1997, two men were convicted for their roles, including the truck driver and the mastermind, Ramzi Yousef.

On June 25, 1996, members of Hezbollah Al-Hejaz bombed the Khobar Towers, a complex in Khobar, Saudi Arabia, where members of the United States Air Force were being housed, killing 19 American airmen and injuring over 300 other people.

On August 7, 1998, Al-Qaeda bombed the U.S. embassies in Kenya and Tanzania, killing 224 people, including 12 Americans. The U.S. launched cruise missile strikes on a terrorist training camp in Afghanistan, yet this failed to destroy al-Qaeda's vast network.

On October 12, 2000, al-Qaeda militants bombed the USS Cole off the coast of Yemen, killing 17 U.S. sailors and severely damaging the ship.

Attacks of September 11

On the morning of September 11, 2001, four airliners were hijacked by 19 members of the terrorist organization al-Qaeda. The first hijacked airliner, American Airlines Flight 11, struck the North Tower of the World Trade Center at 8:46 A.M. (EST) in New York City; with a second, United Airlines Flight 175, striking the South Tower less than twenty minutes later at 9:03 A.M. (EST), resulting in the collapse of both 110 story skyscrapers, and the destruction of the World Trade Center. The third hijacked plane, American Airlines Flight 77, was crashed into the Pentagon (the headquarters of the United States Department of Defense) in Arlington County, Virginia, demolishing a section of the outer southwest facing wall. After passengers discovered that their plane, United Airlines Flight 93, was going to be used as a missile, they attempted to regain control of the aircraft which had been redirected towards Washington, D.C. However, after regaining control from the hijackers, the plane crashed close to a rural community near Shanksville, Pennsylvania. It is believed that the target of Flight 93 was either the White House or the Capitol. In total, the attacks killed 2,996 people—2,507 civilians, 343 firefighters, 72 law enforcement officers, 55 military personnel, and the 19 terrorists. The 9/11 attack was the single deadliest international terrorist incident and the most devastating foreign attack on American soil since the Japanese surprise attack on Pearl Harbor on December 7, 1941. It refocused American attention to a long war on terrorism, beginning with an attack on al-Qaeda and its Taliban supporters in Afghanistan.

War in Afghanistan

After the 9/11 attacks, Congress passed the Authorization for Use of Military Force Against Terrorists, authorizing the President "all necessary and appropriate force against the nations, organizations, or persons he determines planned, authorized, committed, or aided the terrorist attacks that occurred on September 11, 2001." This act resulted in the 2001 invasion of Afghanistan, in President George W. Bush's broader Global War on Terrorism. The objective of the 2001 invasion, known as Operation Enduring Freedom, was to remove the Islamic fundamentalist Taliban lead government from power in Afghanistan, and to capture top level al-Qaeda leaders, including its founder Osama bin Laden. The invasion, fought in conjunction with the U.S.'s NATO allies, began on October 7, 2001, quickly leading to the overthrow of the Taliban government and implementation of Hamid Karzai as Afghanistan's interim president. In early 2002, after the Battle of Tora Bora and success with Operation Anaconda, the United States began focusing on military intervention in Iraq, shifting military and intelligence resources away from Afghanistan in War on Terror, with U.S. Secretary of Defense Donald Rumsfeld stating in May 2003 that the "major combat" in the conflict was over. With the approval of the new Afghan Constitution by the Loya jirga and election of President Karzai in 2004, Afghanistan later held its first parliamentary elections in over 30 years in 2005.

With a total of 22,000 U.S. troops deployed in Afghanistan by May 2006, the U.S. joined in the ISAF lead Operation Mountain Thrust. In the attempt to quell the Taliban insurgency in southern Afghanistan, more than 1,000 insurgents and 150 ISAF troops were killed in the two-month operation, being the bloodiest period since the start of the war in 2001. With ISAF assuming complete command of security forces in Afghanistan in October 2006, the U.S. saw mounting skepticism from European allies over the war at the 2006 Riga summit. U.S.-Afghan diplomatic relations began to flare after the August 2008 Azizabad airstrike in Herat Province, which killed 91 civilians, including 60 children and 15 women. The attack sparked protest over "collateral damage"; with a 40% increase in civilian deaths in 2008.

Iraq War

In his State of the Union address in January 2002, President George W. Bush called Iran, Iraq, and North Korea an "axis of evil". The Bush administration later began making a public case for an invasion of Iraq, accusing them of violating the 1991 UN-imposed ceasefire, supporting terrorism and being in possession of weapons of mass destruction (later, the latter of these accusations were proved to be false, and the first two are considered very dubious by most historians).

Some important allies of the U.S., including India, Japan, Turkey, New Zealand, France, Germany, and Canada, did not believe that the evidence for the President's accusations was well-founded enough to justify a full-scale invasion, especially as military personnel were still needed in Afghanistan. The UN Security Council did not approve of the invasion, and the U.S. therefore provided most of the forces in the invasion of Iraq. With the support of a coalition whose major partners included the United Kingdom, Australia, Poland, Spain, and Italy, Iraq was invaded on March 20, 2003.

After six weeks of combat between the coalition and the Iraqi army, the invading forces had secured control of many key regions; Hussein had fled his palace, his regime clearly over; on May 1, President Bush declared, under a sign reading "mission accomplished", that major ground operations were at an end. Saddam Hussein's sons Qusay and Uday were killed by U.S. forces; Saddam himself was captured in December 2003 and taken into custody. Nevertheless, fighting with the Iraqi insurgency continued and escalated through the 2004 U.S. national elections and beyond.

With casualties increasing and the cost of the invasion and reconstruction of Iraq estimated at over $200 billion, the war has lost about one-third of its supporters in the U.S. since the end of major operations was announced. Contemporary polls suggested that international displeasure with the United States was at an all-time high, with a majority of people in Europe believing that the country was too powerful and acted mainly in self-interest, and a vast majority in predominantly Muslim nations believing that the United States was arrogant, belligerent, or hateful to Islam.

Domestic terrorism

The 1990s and 2000s (decade) became known for several incidents of domestic terrorism, usually perpetrated by those dissatisfied with actions of the federal government, big business, or other aspects of American society.

Throughout the 1970s and 1980s, a mysterious man known in the media as the "Unabomber" sent mail bombs to figures in the academic and airline industries for various reasons. After a lull, he began another mail bombing campaign in earnest, beginning in 1993. Two people were killed in the mid-1990s and an exhaustive and expensive investigation by the FBI coupled with intense national media interest in the story resulted in the identification and arrest of the perpetrator Theodore Kaczynski, who was sentenced to life in prison.

On April 19, 1995, a truck bomb was detonated outside the Alfred P. Murrah Federal Building in Oklahoma City, Oklahoma, killing 168 people and injuring over 600. The bombing became the deadliest act of domestic terrorism in the United States and led to sweeping reforms in United States federal building security. The attack's perpetrator, Timothy McVeigh, was an anti-government extremist who used the Waco Siege and Ruby Ridge incidents as justification for his retaliation against the federal government. While McVeigh wanted to specifically target the federal agencies involved in the Waco siege, such as the ATF and DEA, the bombing killed many innocent civilians, including 19 children. McVeigh was executed in 2001 and his accomplice Terry Nichols was sentenced to life in prison.

In July 1996, in the midst of the 1996 Summer Olympics at Centennial Olympic Park in Atlanta, Georgia, a homemade bomb was detonated, resulting in the deaths of 2 people and injuring over 100. This was followed by similar attacks at two abortion clinics and a lesbian nightclub. In 2003, suspect Eric Robert Rudolph was arrested and sentenced in 2005 to five life sentences for these attacks.

In 2001, only days after the September 11 attacks, letters laced with anthrax were sent to several individuals, including prominent news personalities and government officials. The letters killed 5 people and infected a further 17. This incident of bioterrorism was initially blamed on international terrorist organization al-Qaeda, but in 2008, was determined to stem from a Maryland scientist by the name of Bruce Edward Ivins, who committed suicide before he could be prosecuted.

Crime and violence

The crime epidemic that had begun during the late 1960s finally reached its climax in the early 1990s before starting a steady decline during the Clinton administration. Nevertheless, ongoing addiction (involving sales of marijuana and cocaine) continued to be a major factor in crime in the United States. The overall rate of major crimes fell during the period. In 2009, the FBI estimated 1,318,000 violent crimes occurred nationwide, 1,425,000 in 2000, down from the 1991 level of 1,912,000. Measured per capita, this was a 43% percent drop in violent crime rates. At the time, it was believed that crime had declined because of stricter judicial sentencing practices, the implementation of Three Strikes laws, improving law enforcement technology that made it easier to catch felons, and the end of the crack epidemic. But later statistical assessments ruled out most of these explanations, and tended to find that factors such as greater prosperity, lower alcohol consumption, generation-specific cultural effects, improved security technology, and decreases in leaded petrol had probably caused most of the decline, while public policy conversation began to regret the incarcerative policies of the preceding decades.

In the 1990s and 2000s (decade), a number of highly publicized assaults against lesbian, gay, bisexual, and transgender people occurred in the United States. The most well known of these was the murder of Matthew Shepard in Wyoming after two young men kidnapped, tortured, and murdered him in 1998. In 2009, Congress passed the Matthew Shepard Act, which extended the hate crime law to women, the disabled, and gays, lesbians, bisexuals, and transsexuals.

A spate of school shootings rocked the country in the late 1990s and the 2000s, the most notable being the 1999 Columbine High School massacre, that left 15 people dead, including both perpetrators Eric Harris and Dylan Klebold. The actions of Harris and Klebold would go on to influence many future mass killers. Others include the Westside Middle School massacre (1998), the Red Lake shootings (2005), the West Nickel Mines School shooting (2006), the Virginia Tech shooting (2007), and the Northern Illinois University shooting (2008). Those shootings led to increased debate over gun politics and media violence, as well as an increased focus on mental health, school safety, and anti-bullying.

The Capital Region was struck by the Beltway sniper attacks, a series of sniper attacks on civilians and federal workers by two gunmen over a month-long period in October 2002. The attackers killed 10 people and injured three. Two men were arrested and convicted.

During the 2000s, a series of high-profile child abduction cases occurred, including Danielle van Dam (2002), Samantha Runnion (2002), Elizabeth Smart (2002), Carlie Brucia (2004), and Jessica Lunsford (2005). These incidents led to a public outcry and demands for stricter laws against sex offenders, the most notable of which was Jessica's Law.

In 1992, riots occurred in Los Angeles after four police officers were acquitted in the beating of black motorist Rodney King. The riots occurred primarily in South Central Los Angeles, a predominantly black and Hispanic area. Fifty-five people were killed and more than 2000 were injured. 3,600 fires were set, destroying over 1,000 buildings and widespread looting occurred, especially of businesses owned by Korean Americans. In all, nearly $1 billion in damage was caused.

Disasters

Natural disasters
On August 24, 1992, the category-five Hurricane Andrew made landfall in South Florida, devastating the southern suburbs of Miami, including Homestead, Kendall, and Cutler Ridge. Two days later, the storm made landfall again in a sparsely populated part of Louisiana, with relatively less damage than in Florida. The storm killed 26 people directly, 39 indirectly. With $26 billion in damage, it became the costliest storm in history at that time. The storm was known for many controversies including the sluggish federal response, which may have impacted President George H.W. Bush's image on domestic issues, as well as poor housing construction which may have led to such high levels of destruction.

In March 1993, a massive storm, known as the "Storm of the Century" or "Superstorm" struck the Eastern Seaboard of the United States. The storm was particularly crippling to the Southern United States, where places like Birmingham, Alabama received one-and-a-half feet of snow and record low temperatures, highly unusual for the region. In all, 300 deaths were attributed to the storm and $6 billion in damage was caused.

The Great Flood of 1993 affected the Midwestern United States in the spring and summer of that year, devastating large portions of the Mississippi and Missouri River Valleys and their tributaries.

In the early morning hours of January 17, 1994, the San Fernando Valley region of Los Angeles was hit by a 6.7 magnitude earthquake, known as the "Northridge earthquake". The quake killed more than 70 people and injured 9,000. Most of the fatalities were attributed to collapsed buildings, parking structures, or freeways. Striking an urban area, it was very destructive, causing $20 billion in damage.

In July 1995, the city of Chicago was hit by a heat wave that had severe repercussions. During a five-day spell from July 12 to 16, the high temperature hovered from the mid 90s to the mid 100s. The heat index pushed 120 degrees on many days. The heat wave resulted in the deaths of over 700 people, many of whom were black, elderly, or poor. The event brought increased attention to these segments of the population and the importance of reaching out to them during heat waves, as well as the concept of the urban heat island effect, in which urban environments exacerbate heat and humidity levels. Additionally, power failures and lack of adequate warning and general preparedness aggravated the situation and may have contributed to such high fatalities.

The storm killed 150 people and caused $3 billion in damages.

On May 3, 1999, a violent tornado outbreak struck the Southern Great Plains, predominantly Oklahoma. The most destructive tornado was an F5 tornado that struck Oklahoma City and the suburb of Moore. The tornado is one of the most prominent examples of a tornado striking a major urban area and became the first tornado to incur over $1 billion in damages. In all, the outbreak resulted in 50 deaths and over 600 injuries.

In 2004, four hurricanes--Charley, Frances, Ivan, and Jeanne—struck the state of Florida in a one-month timespan, resulting in over 100 U.S. deaths and nearly $50 billion in damage combined. Out of the four hurricanes, Ivan was the deadliest in the U.S., while Charley was the most destructive.

2005 brought the most active Atlantic hurricane season in recorded history. In August 2005, the powerful Hurricane Katrina struck the Gulf Coast region. Katrina broke the levees of New Orleans, Louisiana and flooded 80% of the low-lying city. Extensive devastation and flooding also occurred from Mobile, Alabama west to Beaumont, Texas, with the Mississippi coastline especially hard hit. At least 1,800 people died in the worst domestic calamity since the 1928 Okeechobee hurricane. Port facilities, oil rigs and refineries in the Gulf region were damaged, further increasing already high U.S. fuel prices. Residents of New Orleans, many of whom were impoverished and unable (or unwilling) to evacuate before the storm, were trapped for days by the flood waters. Tens of thousands had to be rescued by the U.S. military from their rooftops or from unsanitary and dangerous shelters in public buildings. State and local authorities were overwhelmed by the scale of the events. Their response to the disaster, as well the federal government's, were harshly criticized by legislators and citizens who saw in the confusion a dangerous lack of readiness and inability to preserve public safety. President Bush promised that the federal government would underwrite the rebuilding of New Orleans and other storm-damaged areas, the cost of which was estimated to run as high as $200 billion. Only weeks after Katrina, Hurricane Rita struck the Texas/Louisiana border in September. Rita caused the largest evacuation in U.S. history, as millions of people fled the Houston area, as well as portions of Louisiana. Rita resulted in over 100 fatalities, the vast majority of which were indirect, occurring during the evacuation or in the aftermath of the storm. Additionally, $10 billion in damage was attributed to Rita. Later in the season, Hurricane Wilma struck the state of Florida in October 2005, killing 35 people and doing $20 billion worth of damage. The storm yielded the lowest pressure value ever recorded in history before making landfall in Florida, making it the most intense storm on record.

On Super Tuesday in February 2008, in the midst of heated primary elections in multiple states, a destructive tornado outbreak hit the Mid-South region, spawning dangerous nighttime twisters across the region. A total of 87 tornadoes were reported. Over 60 people were killed across Tennessee, Kentucky, Arkansas, and Alabama and hundreds were injured. Losses exceeded $1 billion. The outbreak was the deadliest outbreak in the US in 23 years, and brought renewed attention to the dangers of nighttime tornadoes, winter tornadoes, and the vulnerability of populations in the Southern United States.

In September 2008, after two straight years of not being affected by a serious hurricane, Hurricane Gustav caused $18 billion in damage in Louisiana, and a few weeks later, the Galveston, Texas and Houston, Texas areas were devastated by Hurricane Ike with over $31 billion in damage, making Ike the third most destructive hurricane ever to hit the United States behind Hurricanes Andrew and Katrina. Over 100 people were killed. The hurricanes also caused gas prices to spike to around $4 per gallon.

Other disasters
Notable aviation disasters in the 1990s included TWA Flight 800 crashing off the coast of Long Island, en route to Paris, France, on July 17, 1996, due to an explosion of the fuel tank, killing 230 and EgyptAir Flight 990 crashing south of Nantucket, Massachusetts, en route to Cairo, Egypt, on October 31, 1999, due to deliberate crashing by the first officer, killing 217. Shortly after the 9/11 terrorist attacks, the second-deadliest U.S. aviation incident occurred when American Airlines Flight 587 crashed in Queens, New York, en route to the Dominican Republic, on November 12, 2001, due to overuse of rudder controls by the pilot to counteract turbulence, killing 265 (including 5 on the ground).

On February 1, 2003, the Space Shuttle Columbia disintegrated upon re-entry to the Earth over parts of Texas and Louisiana during STS-107, resulting in the deaths of all seven astronauts. The incident resulted from a piece of foam insulation that fell off during launch, which struck the shuttle, creating a hole that allowed hot gases to penetrate the shuttle during re-entry. In the aftermath of the disaster, the Space Shuttle program was suspended for 29 months as NASA investigated the incident and made plans to prevent future tragedies.

On February 17, 2003, a stampede occurred at the E2 nightclub in Chicago, after an incident involving pepper spray, resulting in the deaths of 21 people. Three days later, on February 20, 100 people perished and over 200 were injured in The Station nightclub fire in West Warwick, Rhode Island, when pyrotechnics ignited flammable sound-proofing during a performance by the band Great White. Both incidents brought attention to the need to crack down on building, fire, and safety code violations to prevent future tragedies. A porch collapse that killed 13 and seriously injured 57 in June 2003 in Chicago further emphasized the problems with building code violations in the United States.

On August 1, 2007, the I-35W Mississippi River bridge in Minneapolis collapsed into the Mississippi River, killing 13 people and injuring over 50. The bridge was under construction at the time. The incident brought to attention the need to inspect and rehabilitate the aging infrastructure system in the United States.

Energy issues

After 1970 the U.S. began importing oil, as consumption kept rising and the nation's oil fields became less productive. Throughout the 1990s the world price of crude oil ranged between $10 and $40, and the average price at the pump did not exceed $1.40. Oil prices tripled after 2002, peaking at $147 in July 2008, about $4 a gallon; the price has continued to fluctuate widely.  The theme of "energy independence" led to legislation mandating more fuel efficient autos—even electric vehicles—and more efficient use of energy, ranging from insulation to new light bulbs. Even worse than the high price, was the fear of shortages. Many proposals and pilot projects for replacement energy sources, from ethanol to wind power and solar power were discussed and, indeed, funded by Congress after 2000.  In the economic stimulus package signed by President Obama in early 2009, billions of dollars were allocated for research and development of new energy sources.

While public attention focused on supplies from the Middle East, the main source was Canada. After 2007, new methods of extraction opened up vast new deposits of oil in the Bakken Formation in North Dakota and Montana. As much as two trillion dollars worth of natural gas is potentially available in the Marcellus Formation deposits located in the historic 19th-century oil fields in Appalachia, stretching from West Virginia through Pennsylvania into western New York. However, there is sharp debate underway regarding the environmental impact on the region's fresh water supply. The question of drilling in the Arctic National Wildlife Refuge (ANWR) was highly controversial, as Republican proposals were blocked by the Democrats in Congress.  Republicans in 2008 were campaigning for more offshore drilling, with the slogan "drill, baby, drill",  but the 2010 Gulf oil spill put all new drilling on hold.

Politics

The Clinton administration

Following the success of the First Gulf War, George H. W. Bush enjoyed very high approval ratings as president. However, economic recession and a reneged campaign pledge dogged Bush, sinking his formerly high approval ratings from the high 80s to the lower 40s and upper 30s. In the wake of Bush's political problems, Bill Clinton won the 1992 contest with 43% of the vote in a three-way race against Bush's 38%. Independent candidate Ross Perot tapped the discontent of the electorate with both parties, drawing roughly evenly from both candidates to receive a record 19% of the popular vote, but no electoral votes. Perot's result qualified his Reform Party to receive Federal Election Commission matching funds for campaign contributions in the 1996 election, thus laying the groundwork for another three-way race during the 1996 presidential election.

Aged 46 when he took office in January 1993, Clinton was one of the youngest presidents in US history and the first born after WWII. Historians and political analysts immediately referred to him as marking a "generational shift" in American politics similar to when John F. Kennedy had become the first president born in the 20th century. His promising to focus on and resolve some of the United States' many domestic issues, he entered office with high expectations. Immediately, however, he was hurt when he had to withdraw major nominees (over nonpayment of taxes). Clinton's surgeon general, Jocelyn Elders, attracted controversy over public remarks that "it would be good for parents to teach their children about masturbation". Much of his planned activity was overwhelmed by the intense debate over his proposal to permit gays to serve in the military. In addition, the president had a difficult time gaining the respect of the US military establishment due to having been painted as a Vietnam War draft dodger. The outcome was a new "don't ask, don't tell" compromise policy and loss of initiative in other areas.

One early domestic victory of the Clinton administration was the enactment of the 1994 Assault Weapons Ban. The ban was widely decried by the Republicans, who allowed it to lapse in 2004 while they controlled both Congress and the presidency. Bill Clinton's proposal of a national health care system, championed by his wife Hillary Clinton, ignited a political firestorm on the right, which vigorously opposed it on the general principle that government size should be reduced, not expanded. The proposed system did not survive the debate.  However Hillary Clinton did succeed, along with a bipartisan coalition of members of congress, in establishing the Children's Health Insurance Program.

The Republican Congress

The New Deal, the Great Society, and Watergate helped solidify Democratic control of Congress, but the 1980s and early 1990s were a period of fragmentation of their coalition, when the popularity of Democratic incumbents as constituent servants masked growing disenchantment with Congress' governing capacities. The strongly liberal policies of Clinton's first two years in office were also a cause of controversy, and the Democrats suddenly lost control of the House and the Senate for the first time in four decades in the 1994 midterm elections. Once in power, House Republicans, led by Newt Gingrich, faced the difficulty of learning to govern after 40 years as the minority party while simultaneously pursuing their "Contract with America", which they unveiled on the steps of Congress on September 27, 1994.

Along with strong backing from traditional Democrats and liberals, Clinton was able to garner the support of moderates who appreciated his centrist "New Democrat" policies, which steered away from the expansion of government services of the New Deal and Great Society and allowed him to "triangulate", taking away many of the Republicans' top issues. One example of such compromises was welfare reform legislation signed into law in 1996. The new law required welfare recipients to work as a condition of benefits and imposed limits on how long individuals may receive payments, but did allow states to exempt 20% of their caseloads from the time limits. Clinton also pursued tough federal anti-crime measures, steering more federal dollars toward the war on drugs, and calling for the hiring of 100,000 new police officers. Compromise came with difficulty, though, as the parties failed to agree on a budget, causing the federal government to shut down in late 1995 into early 1996. By the end of his administration, the federal government had experienced the country's longest economic expansion and produced a budget surplus. The first year of the budget surplus was also the first year since 1969 in which the federal government did not borrow from the Social Security Trust Fund.

The 1996 Democratic National Convention in late August that nominated Clinton sparked protests, such as the one whereby Civil Rights Movement historian Randy Kryn and 10 others were arrested by the Federal Protective Service; later on, in November's 1996 presidential election, Clinton faced Bob Dole, Republican Senator from Kansas. An uninspired insider, Dole failed to attract the support of the GOP base and the incumbent president pulled to victory in the November election. Ross Perot ran for a second time, but was not allowed at the debate between Clinton and Dole and failed to attract as much support as he had in 1992. As a sign of the general cynicism and voter apathy during this period, turnout for the election was only 49%.

Many voters in 1992 and 1996 had been willing to overlook long-standing rumors of extramarital affairs by Clinton, deeming them irrelevant. These matters came to a head, however, in February 1998 when reports surfaced of ongoing sexual relations between Clinton and a White House intern, Monica Lewinsky. Clinton initially and vigorously denied the relationship; "I did not have sexual relations with that woman, Miss Lewinsky." His wife Hillary described the allegations as fraudulent smears dredged up by a "vast right-wing conspiracy." Clinton was forced to retract his assertions in August 1998 after the Lewinsky matter came under investigation by independent counsel Kenneth Starr. Clinton was impeached in the United States House of Representatives, but acquitted at his trial by the U.S. Senate. A public backlash forced Speaker Gingrich to resign after a poor showing in the 1998 midterm elections. In 1999, Republican Dennis Hastert of Illinois became Speaker of the House, a position he would hold until 2007, making him the longest-serving Republican Speaker of the House.

The George W. Bush administration

Though his 2000 election had been the focus of intense controversy which led eventually to a U.S. Supreme Court ruling in Bush v. Gore where the court ruled 5–4 in the former's favor by siding with the State of Florida's official vote count, Governor George W. Bush was sworn in as president on January 20, 2001. This made the 2000 election the third presidential election in which the electoral vote winner did not receive at least a plurality of the popular vote. Early in his term, Bush signed a $1.3 trillion federal tax cut aimed at revitalizing the economy, but the wars in the Middle East as well as assorted domestic spending packages passed by the Republican Congress led to ballooning Federal deficits. Other laws enacted in his first term included the No Child Left Behind Act education reform bill in 2002, the Partial-Birth Abortion Ban Act in 2003 and the Medicare Prescription Drug, Improvement, and Modernization Act in 2004. The first eight months of his term in office were relatively uneventful; however, it had become clear by that time that the economic boom of the late 1990s was at an end. The year 2001 was plagued by a nine-month recession, witnessing the end of the boom psychology and performance, with output increasing only 0.3% and unemployment and business failures rising.

On September 11, 2001, al-Qaeda terrorists hijacked four commercial airliners and attacked the World Trade Center and the Pentagon in the September 11 attacks, killing nearly 3,000 and injuring over 6,000 people. Osama bin Laden claimed responsibility for the attacks. President Bush ordered all flights grounded and U.S. airspace remained closed for the rest of the week. An emergency bailout package for the airline industry was passed, and stocks fell dramatically when markets re-opened the following week. In response to the attacks, the Bush administration and Congress passed the controversial USA PATRIOT Act, aimed at enhancing security, and established the Department of Homeland Security, a mass consolidation of many federal agencies charged with investigation, intelligence, and emergency management. A new Terrorist Finance Tracking Program monitored the movements of terrorists' financial resources but was discontinued after being revealed by The New York Times. Telecommunication usage by known and suspected terrorists was studied through the NSA electronic surveillance program. On October 7, 2001, the United States invaded Afghanistan as part of a global War on Terrorism, aimed at rooting out al-Qaeda, the Taliban, and other terrorist organizations.

In mid-2002, President Bush announced that Iraq possessed chemical and nuclear weapons and posed a "clear and present danger" to stability in the Middle East. Plans for a full-scale military invasion of the country began amid widespread controversy. Antiwar protests occurred around the US and numerous other countries, mostly carried out by left-wing organizations, but some on the right and various military and diplomatic figures also doubted the wisdom of this venture. Regardless, the invasion of Iraq commenced on March 20, 2003. The Iraqi Army disintegrated without much resistance and within three weeks, US troops entered Baghdad to an overjoyed mob of Iraqi civilians who proceeded to tear down the giant statue of Saddam Hussein in the middle of the city. Bush announced on May 1, 2003, from an aircraft carrier that major combat operations in Iraq were completed, with a "Mission Accomplished" banner serving as a backdrop. Although the war was initially popular, a guerrilla insurgency quickly began mostly by Al Qaeda operatives who had entered the country. Led by Abu Musab al-Zarqawi, a wave of bombings and beheadings of captives occurred, including the highly publicized killing of government contractor Nick Berg. Zarqawi was killed by US troops in 2005. Ineffective policing strategies led to a mounting death toll among soldiers, but eventually in 2007 a campaign known as "The Surge" began where the US Army launched a large-scale anti-terrorism offensive. Along with the help of Iraqi locals unhappy with the destruction caused by (largely foreigner) Al Qaeda agents, the surge resulted in the end of most major violence in the country. Late in 2003, Hussein was captured, and was subsequently put to trial before the Iraqi people and executed in 2006.

Meanwhile, the economy recovered from the early 2000s economic recession, with GDP growth rising to 7% in the middle of 2003, with continued growth through the mid-2000s. The unemployment rate peaked at 6% in 2003, before falling in 2004 and 2005, and dropping below 5% in 2006 and 2007.

President George W. Bush was re-elected in November 2004, defeating Democratic contender Senator John Kerry in the electoral vote, and receiving 50.7% of the popular vote against John Kerry's 48.3%. Republicans also made gains in both houses of Congress. President Bush's reelection was assured by public support for the War On Terror, the dour Senator Kerry's lack of appeal to his voter base, and the excessive attacks made on the president by the left, which helped turn public opinion against them. In addition, it came out that Kerry, a Vietnam War veteran, had participated in antiwar protests after returning home in 1970, including throwing away his medals.

Some major acts in President Bush's second term included the Energy Policy Act of 2005, the Safe, Accountable, Flexible, Efficient Transportation Equity Act, and the Troubled Asset Relief Program. After seeing high approval ratings for much of his first term, Bush's popularity plummeted to record lows in his second term, due to his handling of the prolonged Iraq War, Hurricane Katrina, and the financial crisis of 2007–2008. President Bush was succeeded on January 20, 2009, by Barack Obama, a Democratic senator from Illinois.

The Democratic Congress
Democrats swept to victory in the 2006 elections, making Representative Nancy Pelosi Speaker of the United States House of Representatives, the first woman in that position, and electing record numbers of women and minorities. Upon winning the elections, the Democrats drew up a 100-Hour Plan of policy proposals upon assuming power in Congress. Major components of the plan included a pay-as-you-go plan for reducing the deficit; enacting the 9/11 Commission recommendations; increasing the federal minimum wage to $7.25 an hour; allowing the government to negotiate directly with pharmaceutical companies to secure lower drug prices for Medicare patients; and ending large tax subsidies for big oil companies to help foster energy independence.

The 110th Congress did little to influence the war in Iraq besides passing a non-binding resolution against the Bush administration's troop surge. In addition, the House of Representatives  passed a $124 billion emergency spending measure for war funding with the stipulation of a phased troop withdrawal. President Bush vetoed the bill because of the proposal of scaling down forces, making this the second veto of his term.

During the months of May–June 2007, Senator Ted Kennedy and other senators co-sponsored the Comprehensive Immigration Reform Act of 2007. The purpose of this bill called for immigration reform under the intent of bringing amnesty and citizenship. On June 28 the Senate voted 53–45 for cloture, with 60 votes needed, spelling the end to the 2007 Immigration Bill.

See also
 Presidency of George H. W. Bush
 Timeline of United States history
 Timeline of modern American conservatism
 Timeline of United States history (1990–2009)

Notes

Further reading

 Abramson, Paul R., John H. Aldrich, and David W. Rohde. Change and Continuity in the 2004 and 2006 Elections (2007), 324pp
 Barone, Michael. The Almanac of American Politics (1992 and every 2 years to 2012), highly detailed coverage of electoral politics and Congress.
 Berman, William C. From the Center to the Edge: The Politics and Policies of the Clinton Presidency (2001) 160pp
 Edwards III, George C. and Desmond King, eds. The Polarized Presidency of George W. Bush (2007), 478pp; essays by scholars
 Hyland, William G. Clinton's World: Remaking American Foreign Policy (1999)
 Levy, Peter. Encyclopedia of the Clinton Presidency (2002), 400pp; 230 articles, focus on politics
 Congressional Quarterly. Congress and the Nation 1993–1997: A Review of Government and Politics: 103rd and 104th Congresses (1998); Congress and the Nation 1997–2001: A Review of Government and Politics: 105th and 106th Congresses (2002). Congress and the Nation 2001–2005: A Review of Government and Politics: 107th and 108th Congresses (2007); Congress and the National XII 2005–2008 (2010). Highly detailed nonpartisan coverage (1200 pp each) of all national political issues, including domestic & foreign affairs
 Gillon, Steve. The pact: Bill Clinton, Newt Gingrich, and the rivalry that defined a generation (2008) 342 pages
 Johnson, Haynes. The best of times: America in the Clinton years (Houghton Mifflin, 2001) Detailed survey by prominent liberal journalist
 Patterson, James T. Restless Giant: The United States from Watergate to Bush vs. Gore (2005), Oxford History of the United States
 Skocpol, Theda, and Lawrence R. Jacobs. "Accomplished and Embattled: Understanding Obama's Presidency," Political Science Quarterly (Spring 2012) 127#1 pp. 1–24 online
 Stiglitz, Joseph E. The Roaring Nineties: A New History of the World's Most Prosperous Decade (2004) economic history
 Warshaw, Shirley Anne. The Clinton Years (Infobase Publishing, 2009) 524pp; detailed political encyclopedia by prominent scholar
 Zelizer, Julian E., ed. The Presidency of George W. Bush: A First Historical Assessment (Princeton University Press; 2010) 386 pages

Primary sources

 Bush, George W. Decision Points (2010)
 Clinton, Bill. My Life (2004).
 Greenspan, Alan. The Age of Turbulence: Adventures in a New World (2007), memoir by head of Federal Reserve

External links

U.S. Response to End of USSR from the Dean Peter Krogh Foreign Affairs Digital Archives
Challenges facing the US in the 90s from the Dean Peter Krogh Foreign Affairs Digital Archives

Articles containing video clips
1990s in the United States
2000s in the United States